The Pakistan Army Football Club is a Pakistani football club based in Rawalpindi, Punjab. The club was established in 1950 by Pakistan Army and is third oldest existing club in Pakistan after K-Electric (1913) and Pakistan Navy (1948). The club plays in Pakistan Premier League under the licence from Pakistan Football Federation (PFF).

Pakistan Army has won the top-flight football league in Pakistan 4 times, National Football Challenge Cup 2 times and Quaid-e-Azam Trophy 5 times.

The Pakistan Army represented Pakistan in the AFC President's Cup 2006, and again 2007 as last seasons national champions. In both instances, Army showed poor performances, finishing bottom of their groups and failing to qualify for the next rounds of the tournaments. In 2016, Pakistan Army defeated Pakistan Airlines in the All-Pakistan Football Tournament at the Peoples Football Stadium in Karachi.

Competitive record
The club's competitive record since the 2004–05 season are listed below.

Performance in AFC competitions
Asian Club Championship: 1 appearance
1994: Qualifying – 2nd round
AFC President's Cup: 2 appearances
2006: Group Stage
2007: Group Stage

Squad

Current squad

Honours
National Football League/Pakistan Premier League: 4
 1993–94, 1995–96, 2005–06, 2006–07
Pakistan National Football Challenge Cup: 3
 2000, 2001, 2019
Quaid-i-Azam Shield : 5
 1995, 1997, 2001, 2004, 2007

References

 
Football clubs in Pakistan
Pakistan Army
Military association football clubs in Pakistan
1950 establishments in Pakistan
Association football clubs established in 1950
Military sport in Pakistan
Football in Rawalpindi